() ("Two gods") is a name used to refer to the pair of  Aztec deities  and , also known as  and .  translates as "two" or "dual" in Nahuatl and  translates as "god". The existence of such a concept and its significance is a matter of dispute among scholars of Mesoamerican religion. Ometeotl was one as the first divinity, and Ometecuhtli and Omecihuatl when the being became two to be able to reproduce all creation

Definition

There is some evidence that these two gods were considered aspects of a single being, as when a singer in the  asks where he can go given that " " ("they, God, stand double"). The  reports of the two that "" (they were raised and had always been in the thirteenth heaven; nothing was ever known of their beginning, just their dwelling and creation, which were in the thirteenth heaven).

As a result of these references, many scholars (most notably ) interpret the rare name  as "Dual God" or "Lord of the Duality".  further argues that  was the supreme creator deity of the Aztecs, and that the Aztecs envisioned this deity as a mystical entity with a dual nature akin to the European concept of the trinity. He argues that the Aztecs saw  as a transcendental deity and that this accounts for the scarcity of documentary references to it and the absence of evidence of an actual cult to  among the Aztecs.

Critique
Other scholars however, notably Richard Haly (1992), argue that there was no ,  or  among the Aztecs.

First,  cites the Franciscan , who affirms in his chronicle that the "Indians wanted the divine Nature shared by two gods". In his translation of the   introduces a reference to the "God of duality" where it is not explicitly found in the original text, which reads "". Haly argues that  erroneously unites "stands dual" with the Spanish loanword  ("God") to invent this dual deity. Haly, reading the interjection  as part of a longer (and similarly unattested) , argues that this should rather be translated as "juicy maguey God" as the text talks about the imbibing of pulque.

James Maffie in his book Aztec philosophy poses the argument that Aztec religion was pantheistic centered on the entity Teotl.  As a result of the pantheism proposed by Maffie that he claims was practiced by the Aztecs, it is by definition not possible that Ometeotl can be a “God of Duality” that is separate from Teotl, which is contradictory to the way in which Leon-Portilla talks about Ometeotl as a transcendental creator god.

Notes

References

 

 
 

 
  

Aztec gods
Creator gods